Arp 107 is a set of galaxies about 450 million light-years away in the constellation Leo Minor.  The galaxies are in the process of colliding and merging.

See also
 Antennae Galaxies
 Arp 299

References

External links
 
 SIMBAD: VV 233 -- Seyfert 2 Galaxy

Interacting galaxies
Leo Minor
107
05984